Francisco Javier Farinós Zapata (born 29 March 1978) is a Spanish retired footballer who played as a midfielder.

He amassed La Liga totals of 225 games and 18 goals over ten seasons, mainly in representation of Valencia (four years), Villarreal and Mallorca (two apiece). He added 145 matches and 22 goals in Segunda División almost exclusively with Hércules, and also spent several years under contract to Inter Milan, being often loaned.

Club career

Valencia
A versatile midfielder, Farinós was born in Valencia and made his professional debut as an 18-year-old, with hometown's Valencia CF. He was an undisputed starter from 1997 to 2000, helping the Che to the 1999 Copa del Rey and Supercopa de España and scoring five La Liga goals in his final season; to finish his career with the club he appeared in the campaign's UEFA Champions League final, a 0–3 loss against Real Madrid.

Inter Milan
In the summer of 2000, Farinós caught the attention of Serie A's Inter Milan, where he would spend five years (with a Villarreal CF loan in between) without much success. He was out of action for 15 months due to injury, and was only able to pitch in ten league games as his team lost the 2001–02 league title in the last matchday; he did manage, however, to score in a 6–0 home rout of Reggina Calcio on 22 November 2003, under head coach Alberto Zaccheroni.

On 21 March 2002, Farinós returned to the Mestalla Stadium in the quarter-finals of the UEFA Cup: after Francesco Toldo was sent off, he was the player chosen to replace him in goal in an eventual 1–0 win (2–1 on aggregate).

Farinós returned to Spain for 2004–05, joining RCD Mallorca initially on loan. He was relatively used during two top flight seasons – mainly in the first, as the Balearic Islands side could only finish 17th.

Hércules
In 2006–07, after being released by Mallorca and having an unsuccessful trial with Charlton Athletic in England, Farinós joined Hércules CF in Segunda División. He was an undisputed starter when healthy, netting 15 times in the league alone in his three seasons combined; in his third year the Alicante club finished in fourth position with 78 points, all-time best without actually promoting.

Farinós played nearly 3,000 minutes in 2009–10, scoring six goals in 34 games as Hércules returned to the first division after 13 years. He spent the vast majority of the following campaign, however, sidelined due to injury; on 29 January 2011, in his return to action, as a second-half substitute in a 0–3 home loss against FC Barcelona, he was sent off shortly after two bookable offenses; in his second appearance, at home against Real Zaragoza, he helped the hosts come from behind to win it 2–1, scoring the equaliser ten minutes from time and assisting David Trezeguet in the 89th minute-winner.

Later career
In late June 2011, following Hércules' relegation, 33-year-old Farinós agreed to a one-year contract with Levante UD, making this the fourth major club he represented in the Valencian Community. In December of the following year he returned to Villarreal, with the team in the second level; he contributed with 11 appearances (eight starts, 695 minutes of action and a goal in a 1–1 draw at former club Hércules) to help the latter return to the top flight after one year out.

On 11 February 2014, after another lengthy spell on the sidelines due to injury, now in the Achilles tendon of his right leg Farinós announced his retirement from football.

International career
Courtesy of his Valencia performances, Farinós earned his first cap for Spain on 18 August 1999, in a 2–1 friendly win against Poland in Warsaw, being replaced by teammate Gaizka Mendieta at half-time. He added a second a year later with the Netherlands, also in an exhibition game.

Previously, Farinós competed in the 1997 FIFA World Youth Championship.

Honours

Club
Valencia
Copa del Rey: 1998–99
Supercopa de España: 1999
UEFA Intertoto Cup: 1998
UEFA Champions League: Runner-up 1999–2000

Inter
Supercoppa Italiana: Runner-up 2000

References

External links
 
 CiberChe stats and bio 
 Inter archives 
 
 
 
 

1978 births
Living people
Spanish footballers
Footballers from Valencia (city)
Association football midfielders
La Liga players
Segunda División players
Segunda División B players
Valencia CF Mestalla footballers
Valencia CF players
Villarreal CF players
RCD Mallorca players
Hércules CF players
Levante UD footballers
Serie A players
Inter Milan players
Spain youth international footballers
Spain under-21 international footballers
Spain international footballers
Spanish expatriate footballers
Expatriate footballers in Italy
Spanish expatriate sportspeople in Italy